Sureshot was an American supergroup formed in 2007 on the reality television show, Mission: Man Band on VH1. The group consisted of four members who were previously in other singing groups prior to forming Sureshot:

 Bryan Abrams (Color Me Badd)
 Rich Cronin (LFO)
 Chris Kirkpatrick (*NSYNC)
 Jeff Timmons (98 Degrees)

The band had three songs on Mission: Man Band: "Work That Out", "Withoutcha", and "Story of My Life".

References

External links 
 

Musical groups established in 2007
Musical groups disestablished in 2008
American pop music groups
Musical groups from Orlando, Florida
American boy bands
Pop music supergroups
Vocal quartets
2007 establishments in Florida